#1s… and Then Some is the title of a two-disc compilation album released on September 8, 2009 by country music duo Brooks & Dunn. It is the duo's fifth greatest hits package. The package contains two new tracks that were both released as singles, "Indian Summer" and a collaboration with ZZ Top lead guitarist Billy Gibbons, "Honky Tonk Stomp". It is their last release before their five-year hiatus from 2010 to 2015.

Content
The album reprises 28 singles from the duo's previous studio albums, but does not contain any material from 1999's Tight Rope. It also features two new tracks, "Indian Summer" and "Honky Tonk Stomp," the latter of which features ZZ Top lead singer Billy Gibbons. Both of these new songs have been released to radio as singles.

The Essential Brooks & Dunn 
#1s… and Then Some was re-released and re-packaged on April 17, 2012 as The Essential Brooks & Dunn. Both albums have an identical track listing. The Essential Brooks & Dunn peaked at #59 on the U.S. Billboard Top Country Albums chart the week of May 12, 2012.

Track listing

Disc 1
"Honky Tonk Stomp" (Ronnie Dunn, Terry McBride, Bobby Pinson) – 3:01
feat. Billy Gibbons
previously unreleased
 "Brand New Man" (Kix Brooks, Dunn, Don Cook) – 2:59
 "Ain't Nothing 'bout You" (Tom Shapiro, Rivers Rutherford) – 3:22
 "Hillbilly Deluxe" (Brad Crisler, Craig Wiseman) – 4:18
 "How Long Gone" (Shawn Camp, John Scott Sherrill) – 3:40
 "She's Not the Cheatin' Kind" (Dunn) – 3:27
 "A Man This Lonely" (Dunn, Tommy Lee James) - 3:34
 "Rock My World (Little Country Girl)" (Bill LaBounty, Steve O'Brien) – 3:42
 "Red Dirt Road" (Brooks, Dunn) – 4:20
 "The Long Goodbye" (Paul Brady, Ronan Keating) – 3:51
 "You're Gonna Miss Me When I'm Gone" (Brooks, Dunn, Cook)  – 4:52
 "If You See Him/If You See Her" (McBride, James, Jennifer Kimball) – 3:58
feat. Reba McEntire
 "She Used to Be Mine" (Dunn) – 3:56
 "That Ain't No Way to Go" (Brooks, Dunn, Cook) – 3:37
 "Boot Scootin' Boogie" (Dunn) – 3:18

Disc 2
"Indian Summer" (Brooks, Dunn, Bob DiPiero) - 4:22
previously unreleased
 "Play Something Country" (Dunn, McBride) – 3:14
 "My Next Broken Heart" (Brooks, Dunn, Cook) – 2:56
 "Cowgirls Don't Cry" (Dunn, McBride) - 3:41
feat. Reba McEntire
 "Lost and Found" (Brooks, Cook) – 3:47
 "Little Miss Honky Tonk" (Dunn) – 3:01
 "It's Getting Better All the Time" (Cook, Ronnie Bowman)- 4:14
 "We'll Burn That Bridge" (Dunn, Cook) – 2:56
 "He's Got You" (Dunn, McBride) – 3:11
 "Only in America" (Brooks, Dunn, Cook) – 4:29
 "I Am That Man" (McBride, Monty Powell) - 4:09
 "Husbands and Wives" (Roger Miller) – 3:10
 "Neon Moon" (Dunn) – 4:21
 "My Maria" (Daniel Moore, B. W. Stevenson) - 3:30
 "Believe" (Dunn, Wiseman) – 5:39

Personnel on new tracks

Brooks & Dunn
 Kix Brooks - background vocals
 Ronnie Dunn - lead vocals

Additional musicians 
 Mark Casstevens - acoustic guitar
 J. T. Corenflos - electric guitar
 Shawn Fichter - drums
 Billy Gibbons - electric guitar and background vocals on "Honky Tonk Stomp"
 Kenny Greenberg - electric guitar
 Wes Hightower - background vocals
 Tim Lauer - keyboards
 Gary Morse - steel guitar
 Larry Paxton - bass guitar
 Bryan Sutton - electric guitar
 Lonnie Wilson - drums
 Glenn Worf - bass guitar

Chart performance

Weekly charts

Year-end charts

References

#1s… and Then Some Press Release from Arista Nashville. 30 Jun 2009.

2009 compilation albums
Brooks & Dunn albums
Arista Records compilation albums